Melvin R. Novick (September 21, 1932 - May 20, 1986) was an American statistician. He was a professor of Statistics at the University of Iowa, and a consultant for the Educational Testing Service (ETS).

Books

References

1932 births
1986 deaths
People from Chicago
Roosevelt University alumni
University of North Carolina at Chapel Hill alumni
University of Iowa faculty
American statisticians
Mathematicians from Illinois